The 2020–21 Danish 1st Division season is the 25th season of the Danish 1st Division league championship, governed by the Danish Football Association.

From this season a promotion round for the six best placed teams and a relegation round for the six lowest placed teams are introduced. The top two teams of the promotion round are promoted to the 2021–22 Danish Superliga. The teams in 11th and 12th places are relegated to the 2021–22 Danish 2nd Division.

Participants
Silkeborg IF, and Esbjerg fB finished last in the 2019–20 Danish Superliga relegation play-off and were relegated to the 1st Division. Hobro IK lost to Lyngby Boldklub in the relegation play off and was relegated as well. Vejle Boldklub was promoted to the 2020–21 Danish Superliga.

Nykøbing FC, FC Roskilde and Næstved BK were relegated to the 2020–21 Danish 2nd Divisions. Nykøbing FC was relegated after four seasons in the league, FC Roskilde after six seasons, and Næstved BK after two seasons. FC Helsingør won promotion from the 2019–20 Danish 2nd Divisions. They won promotion after only one season's absence.

Stadia and locations

Personnel and sponsoring 
Note: Flags indicate national team as has been defined under FIFA eligibility rules. Players and Managers may hold more than one non-FIFA nationality.

Managerial changes

Regular season

League table

Results

Regular season

Promotion Group
Points and goals carry over in full from the regular season.
<onlyinclude>

Relegation Group
Points and goals carry over in full from the regular season.
<onlyinclude>

Season statistics

Top goalscorers
.

References

External links
  Danish FA

2020–21 in Danish football
Danish 1st Division
Danish 1st Division seasons